Distant Stars is a 1981 collection of science fiction and fantasy short stories by American writer Samuel R. Delany. Many of the stories originally appeared in the magazines The Magazine of Fantasy & Science Fiction, Algol and New Worlds, while the novella Empire Star was originally published as an Ace Double with Tree Lord of Imeten by Tom Purdom.

Contents
 Of Doubts and Dreams
 "Prismatica"
 "Corona"
 "Empire Star"
 "Time Considered as a Helix of Semi-Precious Stones"
 "Omegahelm"
 "Ruins"
 "We, in Some Strange Power’s Employ, Move on a Rigorous Line"

Sources

1981 short story collections
Fantasy short story collections
Science fiction short story collections
Short story collections by Samuel Delany
Books with cover art by Michael Whelan